In My End Is My Beginning is a 2013 South Korean film starring Uhm Jung-hwa, Kim Hyo-jin, and Hwang Jung-min.

In My End Is My Beginning originally appeared as a short film in Five Senses of Eros, a 2009 anthology about sensuality and sexuality. Then writer-director Min Kyu-dong expanded the short into a feature-length director's cut, which provides a fuller version of the story including "the end" of the relationship not shown in the short. This expanded theatrical version made its world premiere at the 2009 Busan International Film Festival. It was later released in theaters on April 4, 2013.

The title is a quotation from the T. S. Eliot poem East Coker, which is taken in turn from "En ma Fin gît mon Commencement", the saying Mary, Queen of Scots, embroidered on her cloth of estate whilst in prison in England.

Plot
Jung-ha (Uhm Jung-hwa) is left alone and heartbroken after her husband Jae-in (Hwang Jung-min) dies in a car accident. Her grief sharpens when she learns after his death that he had been cheating on her with her friend Na-ru (Kim Hyo-jin). As a novelist, Jae-in had been looking for new stimulation to rouse him from his boring routine, and the secrecy and risk of his affair with Na-ru inspired his work. After Jae-in's funeral, Na-ru goes to Jung-ha, begging for forgiveness, saying that she will do anything if only Jung-ha will let her stay at her house. Jung-ha refuses at first, but eventually they begin living together. The strange co-habitation arrangement between Jung-ha and Na-ru and its complicated web of love, hate, lust, and guilt, develops into a lesbian relationship, leading to a new way of life.

Cast
Uhm Jung-hwa ... Lee Jung-ha
Kim Hyo-jin ... Kang Na-ru
Hwang Jung-min ... Min Jae-in
Lee Hwi-hyang ... Jung-ha's mother
Kim Kang-woo ... Jung-ha's younger brother
Jone D. Kim ... one-night stand man
Choi Min-sik ... doctor (voice cameo)

References

External links
 
 
 

2013 films
2013 LGBT-related films
2013 romantic drama films
2010s Korean-language films
Features based on short films
Films directed by Min Kyu-dong
Lesbian-related films
LGBT-related romantic drama films
Lotte Entertainment films
Remakes of South Korean films
South Korean LGBT-related films
South Korean romantic drama films
2010s South Korean films